Qualification for the men's tournament at the 2018 Winter Olympics was determined by the IIHF World Ranking following the 2015 Men's World Ice Hockey Championships. The host along with the top eight teams in the world ranking received automatic berths into the Olympics, while all other teams had an opportunity to qualify for the remaining three spots in the Olympics. This was the fourth time world rankings were used but the first time that the championships three years prior was used as the final determination.

Qualified teams

Notes

Qualification seeding
To qualify directly, a nation had to be ranked in the top eight following the 2015 Men's World Ice Hockey Championships. Using the IIHF World Ranking points system, the current year received full value, and each preceding year was worth 25% less. Teams that wished to compete had to apply in April 2015. The following is a ranking based on points already accumulated toward Olympic qualification of all countries participating in 2015.

Points were earned based on overall finish in 2015:

Three nations were not listed who have achieved ranking points but were not participating in IIHF tournaments: Ireland, Greece, and Mongolia.
Nations with no seeding chose not to participate in Olympic qualifying.

Preliminary round 1
The two lowest ranked participants played off for the right to compete in this round on 10 October 2015, in Sofia, Bulgaria. The round itself was played from 5 to 8 November 2015. The winner of each group advanced to the pre-qualification tournaments as qualifiers seven and eight ranked according their seeding.

Playoff game

Group K
Games were played at Tallinn, Estonia.

All times are local (UTC+2).

Group L
Games were played in Valdemoro, Spain.

All times are local (UTC+1).

Preliminary round 2
Three round robins were played from 11 to 14 February 2016. The teams seeded 18th, 19th, and 20th reserved the right to host these tournaments. The winners of each advanced to the final qualification tournaments as qualifiers four, five, and six, ranked according to their seeding.

Group G
Games were played at Cortina, Italy.

All times are local (UTC+1).

Group H
Games were played at the László Papp Budapest Sports Arena at Budapest, Hungary.

All times are local (UTC+1).

Group J
Games were played in Sapporo, Japan.

All times are local (UTC+9).

Final qualification
Three round robins were played from 1 to 4 September 2016. The teams seeded 9th, 10th, and 11th reserved the right to host these tournaments. The top two seeded group winners qualified for the Olympic tournament Group C, and the third seeded group winner qualified for Group B.

Group D
Games were played in Minsk, Belarus.

All times are local (UTC+3).

Group E
Games were played in Riga, Latvia.

All times are local (UTC+3).

Group F
Games were played in Oslo, Norway.

All times are local (UTC+2).

References

qualification
Qualification for the 2018 Winter Olympics
2015 in ice hockey
2016 in ice hockey